One Million Strong is a 1995 compilation of hip hop music released by Mergela Records/SOLAR to commemorate the 1995 Million Man March in Washington, D.C. The compilation was released on November 7, 1995 and featured some of hip hop's biggest names, including the song "Runnin'", which was one of the few collaborations between 2Pac and Notorious B.I.G. The album peaked at number 36 on the US Top R&B/Hip-Hop Albums chart.

Track listing 

Notes
Track 5 is listed as "No Hands Out" on some editions of the album
Track 11 contains music replayed from Kool & the Gang's "Get Down on It"

References

External links

SOLAR Records albums
1995 compilation albums
Albums produced by Dr. Dre
Hip hop compilation albums
Albums produced by Easy Mo Bee
Albums produced by 4th Disciple
Albums recorded at Chung King Studios